The 1940 Victorian state election was held on 16 March 1940.

Retiring Members

United Australia
Clive Shields MLA (Castlemaine and Kyneton)

Legislative Assembly
Sitting members are shown in bold text. Successful candidates are highlighted in the relevant colour. Where there is possible confusion, an asterisk (*) is also used.

See also
1940 Victorian Legislative Council election

References

Psephos - Adam Carr's Election Archive

Victoria
Candidates for Victorian state elections